Hendrick Theyanoguin (c. 1691 – September 8, 1755), whose name had several spelling variations, was a Mohawk leader and member of the Bear Clan. He resided at Canajoharie or the Upper Mohawk Castle in colonial New York.  He was a Speaker for the Mohawk Council. Hendrick formed a close alliance with Sir William Johnson, the Superintendent of Indian affairs in North America.

Until the late 20th century, Hendrick's biography was conflated with an older Mohawk leader given the same first name in baptism, Hendrick Tejonihokarawa (also known as Hendrick Peters) (c. 1660 – c. 1735).  The latter was a member of the Wolf Clan (an important difference, as shown by the historian Barbara Silvertsen) and based in Tiononderoge, the Lower Castle, closer to the English base in Albany. The English built Fort Hunter in Tionondaga in 1711 with an Anglican mission.  The Mohawk village became mostly Christianized early in the eighteenth century.

Biography
Theyanoguin was born to a Mohawk noblewoman and a Mohican chief in Westfield, Massachusetts. By the Mohawk matrilineal kinship system, he was considered born into his mother's Bear Clan. Hereditary offices and property are passed through the maternal line and the mother's oldest brother plays a prominent role in her children's lives, especially for boys. The uncle is more important than the biological father. This system allowed the Mohawk to adopt and assimilate war captives into the tribe, absorbing them as Mohawk. Theyanoguin was baptized as "Hendrick" by Godfridius Dellius of the Dutch Reformed Church in 1692. The English referred to him as Hendrick Peters or King Hendrick.

At some point, Theyanoguin resettled at Canajoharie, one of two major Mohawk towns by the early 18th century. Both were located on the south side of the Mohawk River. European colonists referred to it as the "Upper Castle", in the Mohawk River valley upriver and west of Schenectady. Theyanoguin became a chief of the Mohawk Bear clan and would have participated in the Mohawk Council. He was not one of the fifty League sachems of the Iroquois Grand Council, made up of representatives of the Five Nations (six, after the Tuscarora were admitted in 1722).

Theyanoguin worked to continue the alliance with the English to preserve Mohawk and Iroquois interests in New York. They depended more on diplomacy than warfare, and tried to preserve neutrality during the English-French rivalries and conflicts of the colonial years.

In 1746, Theyanoguin led a delegation of Mohawks to a conference with the Governor of New France, Charles de la Boische, Marquis de Beauharnois, at Montreal. On their return journey, they stopped at Isle La Motte and attacked a group of Frenchmen collecting timber, killing one and taking another prisoner before returning to Albany. That spring, Theyanoguin led a war party to the St. Lawrence near Montreal, which was repulsed by the French, though attempts to capture Theyanoguin were unsuccessful. 

During the French and Indian War (the North American theater of the Seven Years' War, 1754-1763), Theyanoguin led a group of Mohawk warriors to accompany William Johnson, the British Superintendent of Indian Affairs, through the Hudson Valley in his expedition to Crown Point. In 1753 Theyanoguin made a speech to the governor of New York saying: "Brother, by and by you will expect to see the Nations (the Six Nations of the Iroquois) down here" (i.e. in New York). Contemporary newspapers and broadsheets made much of the fear of this threat.

Theyanoguin was killed at the Battle of Lake George on September 8, 1755, on a mission to stop the southern advance of the French army; he was bayonetted after his horse was shot dead.

Sir William Johnson established an Anglican mission in Canajoharie in 1769, when he paid for the Indian Castle Church to be built nearby. This was several years before the American Revolutionary War. Today it has been designated as part of the Mohawk Upper Castle Historic District, a National Historic Landmark. A mission was established earlier in the century at Fort Schuyler on Schoharie Creek.

References
Notes

Bibliography
Anderson, Fred. Crucible of War: The Seven Years' War and the Fate of Empire in British North America, 1754–1766, New York: Knopf, 2000. .
Drake, Samuel G.., Shirley, William. A Particular History of the Five Years French and Indian War in New England and Parts Adjacent: From Its Declaration by the King of France, March 15, 1744, to the Treaty with the Eastern Indians, Oct. 16, 1749, Sometimes Called Gov. Shirley's War ; with a Memoir of Major-General Shirley, Accompanied by His Portrait and Other Engravings. United States: Samuel G. Drake, 1870.
Hinderaker, Eric. The Two Hendricks: Unraveling a Mohawk Mystery. Cambridge, Massachusetts: Harvard University Press, 2010. .
Sivertsen, Barbara J. Turtles, Wolves, and Bears: A Mohawk Family History (1996), reprint Heritage Books, 2007, genealogy 
Snow, Dean R. "Searching for Hendrick: Correction of a Historic Conflation". New York History, Summer 2007. Accessed August 11, 2009.

External links
  Like most biographies written before early 21st-century research distinguished between the leaders, this entry conflates the two Hendricks
Taverns, Forts & Castles: Re-Discovering King Hendrick's Village by Philip Lord, Jr.

1690s births
1755 deaths
Military personnel killed in the French and Indian War
American Mohawk people
Native American leaders
People of the Province of New York
American members of the Dutch Reformed Church
Indigenous people of the French and Indian War
People from Canajoharie, New York
Deaths by bayonet
Native American people from Massachusetts
Native American people from New York (state)
People from Westfield, Massachusetts